Angelia Orr is an American politician and small business owner, who is a Republican member of the Texas House of Representatives for district 13.

Orr was formerly the District Clerk of Hill County.

References

Living people
Republican Party members of the Texas House of Representatives
People from Hill County, Texas
21st-century American politicians
21st-century American women politicians
Women state legislators in Texas
Year of birth missing (living people)